Christian Harrison and Dennis Novikov were the defending champions but lost in the semifinals to William Blumberg and Max Schnur.

Blumberg and Schnur won the title after defeating Stefan Kozlov and Peter Polansky 6–4, 1–6, [10–4] in the final.

Seeds

Draw

References

External links
 Main draw

Cary Challenger II - Doubles
2021 Doubles 2